The 2017–18 SV Werder Bremen season was the 119th season in the football club's history and 37th consecutive and 54th overall season in the top flight of German football, the Bundesliga, having been promoted from the 2. Bundesliga Nord in 1981. In addition to the domestic league, Werder Bremen were participating in this season's edition of the domestic cup competition, the DFB-Pokal. This was the 71st season for Bremen in the Weser-Stadion, located in Bremen, Free Hanseatic City of Bremen, Germany. The season covered a period from 1 July 2017 to 30 June 2018.

Players

Squad information

Competitions

Overview

Bundesliga

League table

Results summary

Results by round

Matches

DFB-Pokal

Statistics

Appearances and goals

|-
! colspan=14 style=background:#dcdcdc; text-align:center| Goalkeepers

|-
! colspan=14 style=background:#dcdcdc; text-align:center| Defenders

|-
! colspan=14 style=background:#dcdcdc; text-align:center| Midfielders

|-
! colspan=14 style=background:#dcdcdc; text-align:center| Forwards

|-
! colspan=14 style=background:#dcdcdc; text-align:center| Players transferred out during the season

References

SV Werder Bremen seasons
Bremen, Werder, SV